Euphoria herbacea is a species of scarab beetle in Cetoniinae subfamily. It is endemic to the United States, especially to the Mississippi River.

References

Further reading
 

Cetoniinae
Endemic fauna of the United States